James Arrington (born 12 September 1952) is an American stage actor, director, playwright and scholar.  His plays are about the people or the culture of the Church of Jesus Christ of Latter-day Saints (LDS Church).

Arrington studied at the American Conservatory Theater in San Francisco and has a master's degree from Brigham Young University. He was twice the Department Chair for the Department of Theatrical Arts for Stage and Screen at Utah Valley University.  Arrington is the son of LDS historian Leonard J. Arrington.

Arrington's plays include one man shows on LDS Church leaders Brigham Young, J. Golden Kimball and Wilford Woodruff. Here's Brother Brigham, in which Arrington wrote and performs, is a two-hour, two-act play in which Brigham Young reads letters, reminisces about his past and has conversations with other people. By 2001, Arrington had performed the play almost 700 times.

He has written and produced a large number of plays around the fictional Farley family. One to four actors play up to 20 different members of the Farley family.  The play is also performed by other actors including a U.S. Army performance company in Iraq and Afghanistan.  The play has spawned a book entitled, Aunt Pearl's Family Reunion Book: Personal Pointers on "How to 'Farley-Up Your Family Reunion" Reunion Book.

Arrington has also lent his voice talents to animated film productions, including The Swan Princess series as Sir Chamberlain.  He also was one of the lead voice talents in the animated film "Samuel the Boy Prophet" and several other Bible themed animated features produced by Richard Rich.  He also voiced the character Frodo Baggins in the 1979 radio dramatization of The Lord of the Rings by The Mind's Eye radio company.

Arrington was awarded the 2019 Smith-Pettit Award for Outstanding Contribution to Mormon Letters.

Works

Here's Brother Brigham (1976)
Farley Family Reunion (1980)
J. Golden (1982)
Wilford Woodruff: God's Fisherman (with Tim Slover, 1987)
Farley Family Reunion II: The Next Gyration (1993)
The Prophet (1995)
Trail of Dreams (with Marvin Payne and Steven Kapp Perry, 1997)
Farley Family Xmas (1997)
Tumuaki! Matthew Cowley of the Pacific (1997)
The M.A.K.E.R. (2001)
Youtahneeks (2001)
March of the Salt Soldiers (with Mahonri Stewart, 2008)

References

External links
 
 
 

20th-century American male actors
21st-century American male actors
Latter Day Saints from Utah
American Mormon missionaries in Brazil
American male voice actors
American male stage actors
Brigham Young University alumni
Utah Valley University faculty
Living people
1952 births